Number 76 Squadron was a squadron of the Royal Air Force. It was formed during World War I as a home defence fighter squadron and in its second incarnation during World War II flew as a bomber squadron, first as an operational training unit and later as an active bomber squadron. With the end of the war the squadron converted to the role of transport squadron, to be reactivated shortly in the bomber role during the 1950s. From 2007 to 2011, it was a training unit, equipped with the Short Tucano at RAF Linton-on-Ouse.

History

First World War
No. 76 Squadron, RFC was formed at RFC Ripon, Yorkshire for home defence duties on 15 September 1916 in the Yorkshire area, having detachments at Copmanthorpe, Helperby and Catterick. It was equipped with Royal Aircraft Factory B.E.2s and B.E.12s, these being replaced by Bristol F.2Bs in 1918. The squadron disbanded at Bramham Moor on 13 June 1919, having seen no action during this part of its service life.

Second World War

Wellesleys, Hampdens and Ansons
The squadron was next reformed at RAF Finningley on 12 April 1937 from 'B' Flight of No. 7 Squadron, equipped with Vickers Wellesley bombers. These were replaced by Handley Page Hampdens and Avro Ansons in April 1939, the unit moving to RAF Upper Heyford at the outbreak of war. It performed an operational training role until 8 April 1940, when it merged with No. 7 Squadron to form No. 16 Operational Training Unit (OTU).

Halifaxes

The squadron reformed shortly on 30 April 1940 at RAF West Raynham as a Hampden unit before being disbanded on 2 May 1940. On 1 May 1941, the squadron reformed properly at RAF Linton-on-Ouse as the second Handley Page Halifax bomber squadron, part of the newly created No. 4 Group, RAF Bomber Command. The Squadron moved to RAF Middleton St. George in June 1941, returning to Linton-on-Ouse in July 1942. The squadron moving again, this time to RAF Holme-on-Spalding Moor in June 1943 as part of a policy to allow the newly formed Canadian 6 Group to use the better equipped RAF stations that had been built pre-war. The Squadron had a substantial number of Norwegian pilots and aircrew.

From August 1942 to April 1943, No. 76 Squadron was commanded by Wing Commander Leonard Cheshire.

Dakotas
With the rest of No. 4 Group, No. 76 Squadron was transferred to RAF Transport Command in May 1945, re-equipping with Douglas Dakotas, shortly thereafter moving to RAF Broadwell. It moved to India in September the same year, where it was disbanded on 1 September 1946 at Palam Airport by being re-numbered to No. 62 Squadron.

Post-war
On 9 December 1953, the squadron reformed at RAF Wittering, equipped with English Electric Canberra B.2 bombers. The squadron moved in November 1955 to RAF Weston Zoyland, for Operation Grapple. Some of these aircraft were tasked with collecting air samples during the Operation Grapple nuclear trials in 1956/58. 

The work of the 76 Squadron on Christmas Island (also referred to as Kiritimati) in 1957 and 1958 is of particular note as they were tasked with flying through the atomic cloud, making several cuts at different altitudes, in order to collect information on the radioactivity in the mushroom cloud which formed after the bomb was detonated.  

These megaton explosions were greatly stronger than those dropped on Hiroshima and Nagasaki.

The measurements made each mission by the sampler aircraft – named as Sniff Boss, Sniff 1, Sniff 2, and Sniff 3 - focused on Gamma radiation.  The instruments carried by each sampling aircraft were Sample Strength Indicator (Salmon), Dose Rate Meter (Romeo), Integrating Dose Meter (Charlie), a personal Quartz Fibre Dosimeter and a Personal Film Badge Dosimeter.  
 
Crew members were limited to being exposed to 10r (Roentgen_(unit)) of radiation, however there are records which indicate that some crew members were exposed to much greater amounts of radiation – up to three times the amount. There is much discussion about the impact that these missions had on the health of these servicemen in addition to the health of their offspring – in particular from genetic damage.

The nuclear cloud sampling missions were achieved through the use of specially adapted B6 Canberras. When asked what a radioactive cloud feels like the pilots replied ‘Like smog over Manchester.”

The squadron disbanded on 30 December 1960 at RAF Upwood.

Training
The squadron remained dormant until 1 May 2007, when the Short Tucano T.1 Air Navigation Squadron at RAF Linton-on-Ouse was redesignated as No. 76 (Reserve) Squadron.  In 2008, Prince William spent three months at Linton learning to fly. No. 76 Squadron continued to train WSOs (Weapons Systems Officers) until December 2010, and was disbanded in May 2011.

Aircraft operated
Aircraft operated include:

 Royal Aircraft Factory B.E.2c (September 1916 – 1917)
 Royal Aircraft Factory B.E.2e (December 1916 – August 1918)
 Royal Aircraft Factory B.E.12 (September 1916 – August 1918)
 Royal Aircraft Factory B.E.12a (December 1916 – August 1918)
 Airco DH.6 (September 1916 – 1917)
 Royal Aircraft Factory R.E.8 (May 1917 – July 1918)
 Royal Aircraft Factory B.E.12b (March 1918 – August 1918)
 Bristol F.2b (July 1918 – August 1918)
 Avro 504K (August 1918 – May 1919)
 Vickers Wellesley (April 1937 – April 1939)
 Handley Page Hampden Mk.I (March 1939 – April 1940)
 Avro Anson Mk.I (May 1939 – April 1940)
 Handley Page Halifax B.I (May 1941 – March 1942)
 Handley Page Halifax B.II (October 1941 – April 1943)
 Handley Page Halifax B.V (February 1943 – February 1944)
 Handley Page Halifax B.III (January 1944 – April 1945)
 Handley Page Halifax B.VI (March 1945 – May 1945)
 Douglas Dakota Mk.IV (May 1945 – September 1946)
 English Electric Canberra B.2 (December 1953 – December 1955)
 English Electric Canberra B.6 (December 1955 – December 1960)
 Short Tucano T.1 (May 2007 – May 2011)

References
Notes

Bibliography

 Bowyer, Michael J.F. and John D.R. Rawlings. Squadron Codes, 1937–56. Cambridge, UK: Patrick Stephens Ltd., 1979. .
 Delve, Ken. The Source Book of the RAF. Shrewsbury, Shropshire, UK: Airlife Publishing, 1994. .
 Flintham, Vic and Andrew Thomas. Combat Codes: A full explanation and listing of British, Commonwealth and Allied air force unit codes since 1938. Shrewsbury, Shropshire, UK: Airlife Publishing Ltd., 2003. .
 Halley, James J. The Squadrons of the Royal Air Force & Commonwealth, 1918–1988. Tonbridge, Kent, UK: Air Britain (Historians) Ltd., 1988. .
 Jefford, C.G. RAF Squadrons, a Comprehensive record of the Movement and Equipment of all RAF Squadrons and their Antecedents since 1912. Shrewsbury, Shropshire, UK: Airlife Publishing, 1988 (second edition 2001). .
 Lake, Alan. Flying Units of the RAF: The ancestry, formation and disbandment of all flying units from 1912. Shrewsbury, Shropshire, UK: Airlife Publishing, 1999. .
 Moyes, Philip J.R. Bomber Squadrons of the RAF and their Aircraft. London: Macdonald and Jane's (Publishers) Ltd., 2nd edition 1976. .
 Rawlings, John D.R. Coastal, Support and Special Squadrons of the RAF and their Aircraft. London: Jane's Publishing Company Ltd., 1982. .
 Rawlings, John D.R. Fighter Squadrons of the RAF and their Aircraft. London: Macdonald & Jane's (Publishers) Ltd., 1969 (2nd edition 1976, reprinted 1978). .
 Sturtivant, Ray, ISO and John Hamlin. RAF Flying Training And Support Units since 1912. Tonbridge, Kent, UK: Air-Britain (Historians) Ltd., 2007. .

External links

 Royal Air Force History: History of No. 76 Squadron
 Air of Authority: No 76 – 80 Squadron Histories
 Air of Authority: Aircraft and Markings for 76 sqn
 One of the Many The story of a 76 Squadron Flight Engineer in World War II
 Brief History of 76 Squadron from Christmas Island News
 76 Squadron Exposed
 Curse of the Nuclear Cloud Flyers
 The Mirror: Operation Grapple - where Britain exploded the most powerful weapon it has ever built
 The Guardian: Pilot told to fly through atom bomb cloud

076 Squadron
076 Squadron
Military units and formations established in 1916
1916 establishments in the United Kingdom